Volley Millenium Brescia is an Italian women's volleyball club based in Brescia and currently playing in the SuperLega.

Previous names
Due to sponsorship, the club have competed under the following names:
 Millenium Brescia (1999–2017)
 Savallese Millenium Brescia (2017–present)

History
The club was established in 1999 and its teams (girls, youth, junior and senior) started participating in local and regional competitions. After a restructure process in 2006, the club adopted a more professional oriented model that allowed the first team to move from regional to national competitions. It reached Serie D (in 2008), Serie C (in 2010), Serie B2 (in 2011) and Serie B1 (in 2013). The club won the 2015–16 Serie B1 promotion playoff and made its debut in the Serie A2 on the following season.

Venue
The club played its home matches at the PalaMillenium (in Bagnolo Mella) until 2017, when ahead of the 2017–18 season it moved to the PalaGeorge (in Montichiari), which has a 4,000 spectators capacity.

Team
Season 2018–2019, as of December 2018.

References

External links
 Official website 

Italian women's volleyball clubs
Volleyball clubs established in 1999
1999 establishments in Italy
Sport in Brescia